One Arabian Night is a 1923 British silent comedy film directed by Sinclair Hill and starring George Robey. It is based on the story of Aladdin.

Cast
 Aubrey Fitzgerald as Servant  
 Lionelle Howard as Aladdin  
 Julia Kean as Princess  
 H. Agar Lyons as Li-Pong  
 Edward O'Neill as Abanazar 
 George Robey as Widow Twan-Kee  
 Basil Saunders as Slave of the Lamp  
 W.G. Saunders as Emperor  
 Julie Suedo as Fairy of the Ring

References

Bibliography
 Goble, Alan. The Complete Index to Literary Sources in Film. Walter de Gruyter, 1999.
 Low, Rachael. The History of the British Film 1918-1929. George Allen & Unwin, 1971.

External links
 
 
 Entry of film in Progressive Silent Film List
 Scene from the film at www.gettyimages.com

1923 films
1923 comedy films
British comedy films
British silent feature films
Films directed by Sinclair Hill
British black-and-white films
1920s English-language films
1920s British films
Silent comedy films